The Czech Social Democratic Party (ČSSD) leadership election of 2015 was held in March 2013. The incumbent leader Bohuslav Sobotka was elected for another term. Sobotka received 84% of votes.

Voting

References

Czech Social Democratic Party leadership elections
Social Democratic Party leadership election
Social Democratic Party leadership election
Single-candidate elections
Indirect elections
Czech Social Democratic Party leadership election
Czech Social Democratic Party leadership election